Feistritz bei Anger is a former municipality in the district of Weiz in the Austrian state of Styria. Since the 2015 Styria municipal structural reform, it is part of the municipality Anger.

Geography
Feistritz lies about 35 km northeast of Graz, 10 km east of Weiz, and 10 km west of the Stubenbergsee.

References

Cities and towns in Weiz District